Strays is a 1997 American drama film written, directed by, and starring Vin Diesel. It follows a drug dealer and hustler who is fed up with the repetitious lifestyle he leads and begins looking for meaning in his life. It marked Diesel's feature film directing debut and takes a hard look at his own adolescence and upbringing in New York City. The film premiered at the 1997 Sundance Film Festival.

Synopsis
Frustrated by the repetitious grind of one-night stands and aimless hustling, Rick is looking for meaning in his life. Like his testosterone-tweaked buddies, Rick is a stray looking for a traditional family structure and wrestling unconsciously with his own father's absence. He sells small amounts of marijuana to cover the expenses of his own use but insists that he is not doing it for a living.

When he meets Heather, the girl next door, he suddenly perceives a new avenue and an opportunity for a new, committed relationship. Trying to assimilate into Heather's world, Rick takes heat from his perpetually adolescent cohorts whose ambitions are restricted to riding fast, toking slow, and ditching hard. Though the chemistry between the couple is immediately charged, Rick's street chic and volatile aggression threaten to extinguish their relationship before it has ever begun.

Cast

Production 
Diesel drew inspiration for the film from his own upbringing in New York City. The film helped Diesel secure a role in Saving Private Ryan after director Steven Spielberg viewed it.

The film was shot in 16 mm.

References

External links
 
 

1997 films
1997 drama films
1997 directorial debut films
1997 independent films
American drama films
Films shot in 16 mm film
Films directed by Vin Diesel
1990s English-language films
1990s American films